Jingulu may refer to:
 Jingulu people, an ethnic group of Australia
 Jingulu language, an Australian language

Language and nationality disambiguation pages